This is a list of state leaders in the 13th century (1201–1300) AD, except for the many leaders within the Holy Roman Empire.

Africa

Africa: Central

Chad

Kanem Empire (Kanem–Bornu) (complete list) –
Salmama I, Mai (1176–1203)
Dunama Dabbalemi, Mai (1203–1242)
Kaday I, Mai (1242–1270)
Biri I, Mai (1270–1290)
Ibrahim I, Mai (1290–1310)

Africa: East

Ethiopia

Zagwe dynasty of Ethiopia (complete list) –
Gebre Mesqel Lalibela, Negus (1189–1229)
Na'akueto La'ab, Negus (mid 13th century)
Yetbarak, Negus (mid 13th century)
Mairari, Negus? (?–c.1300)
Harbai, Negus? (13th century)

Ethiopian Empire: Solomonic dynasty (complete list) –
Yekuno Amlak, Emperor (1270–1285)
Yagbe'u Seyon, Emperor (1285–1294)
Senfa Ared IV, Emperor (1294–1295)
Hezba Asgad, Emperor (1295–1296)
Qedma Asgad, Emperor (1296–1297)
Jin Asgad, Emperor (1297–1298)
Saba Asgad, Emperor (1298–1299)
Wedem Arad, Emperor (1299–1314)

Somalia

Sultanate of Ifat: Walashma dynasty (complete list) –
ʿUmar DunyaHuz, Sultan (1185–1228)
ʿAli "Baziwi" ʿUmar, Sultan (1228–?)
ḤaqqudDīn ʿUmar, Sultan (13th century)
Ḥusein ʿUmar, Sultan (13th century)
NasradDīn ʿUmar, Sultan (13th century)
Mansur ʿAli, Sultan (13th century)
JamaladDīn ʿAli, Sultan (13th century)
Abūd JamaladDīn, Sultan (13th century)
Zubēr Abūd, Sultan (13th–14th century)

Warsangali –
Garaad Dhidhin, King (1298–1311)

Africa: Northeast

Egypt

Abbasid Caliphate, Cairo (complete list) –
from Baghdad
al-Mustansir, Caliph (1261–1262)
al-Hakim I, Caliph (1262–1302)

Mamluk Sultanate (complete list) –
Salihi Mamluks
Aybak, Sultan (1250–1257)
al-Mansur Ali, Sultan (1257–1259)
Qutuz, Sultan (1259–1260)
Bahri dynasty
Baibars, Sultan (1260–1277)
Al-Said Barakah, Sultan (1277–1279)
Solamish, Sultan (1279)
Al-Mansur Qalawun, Sultan (1279–1290)
Al-Ashraf Khalil, Sultan (1290–1293)
Al-Nasir Muhammad, Sultan (1293–1294)
Al-Adil Kitbugha, Sultan (1294–1296)
Lajin, Sultan (1296–1299)
Al-Nasir Muhammad, Sultan (1299–1309)

Sudan

Makuria (complete list) –
Murtashkar, King (c.1268)
David, King (c.1268–1272)
Shekanda, King (c.1276)
Barak, King (c.1279)
Semamun, King (c.1286–1287/8)
nephew of Semamun, King (1287/8–1288)
Semamun, King (c.1288–1289, c.1290–1295)
nephew of David (Budamma), King (c.1289–1290)

Africa: Northcentral

Ifriqiya

Hafsid dynasty (complete list) –
Abu Zakariya, ruler (1229–1249)
Muhammad I al-Mustansir, Khalif (1249–1277)
Muse Mohammed, Khalif (1223–1270)
Yahya II al-Watiq, Khalif (1277–1279)
Ibrahim I, Khalif (1279–1283)
Ibn Abi Umara, Khalif (1283–1284)
Abu Hafs Umar I, Khalif (1284–1295)
Muhammad I, Khalif (1295–1309)

Africa: Northwest

Morocco

Almohad Caliphate of Morocco (complete list) –
Muhammad al-Nasir, Caliph (1199–1213)
Yusuf II, Caliph (1213–1224)
Abd al-Wahid I, Caliph (1224)
Abdallah al-Adil, Caliph (1224–1227)
Yahya al-Mu'tasim, Caliph (1227–1229)
Idris al-Ma'mun, Caliph (1229–1232)
Abd al-Wahid II, Caliph (1232–1242)
Said al-Muʿtadid, Caliph (1242–1248)

Marinid dynasty of Morocco (complete list) –
Abu Yahya ibn Abd al-Haqq, Sultan (1244–1258)
Abu Yusuf Yaqub ibn Abd Al-Haqq, Sultan (1258–1286)
Abu Yaqub Yusuf an-Nasr, Sultan (1286–1307)

Africa: West

Benin

Kingdom of Benin (complete list) –
Eweka I, Oba (1180–1246)
Uwuakhuahen, Oba (1246–1250)
Henmihen, Oba (1250–1260)
Ewedo, Oba (1260–1274)
Oguola, Oba (1274–1287)
Edoni, Oba (1287–1292)
Udagbedo, Oba (1292–1329)

Burkina Faso

Mossi Kingdom of Nungu (complete list) –
Diaba Lompo, Nunbado (1204–1248)
Tidarpo, Nunbado (1248–1292)
Untani, Nunbado (1292–1336)

Mali

Mali Empire: Keita dynasty (complete list) –
Sundiata Keita, Mansa (c.1235–c.1255)
Uli I, Mansa (1255–1270)
Wati, Mansa (1270–1274)
Khalifa, Mansa (1274-1275)
Abu Bakr I, Mansa (1275–1285)
Sakoura, Mansa (1285–1300)
Gao, Mansa (1300–1305)

Nigeria

Kingdom of Kano (complete list) –
Naguji, King (1194–1247)
Guguwa, King (1247–1290)
Shekarau, King (1290–1307)

Kingdom of Nri (complete list) –
Eze Nri Buífè, King (1159–1259)
Eze Nri Ọmalọ, King (1260–1299)
Eze Nri Jiọfọ I, King (1300–1390)

Americas

Americas: South

Incas

Kingdom of Cusco (complete list) –
Manco Cápac, Inca (c.1200–1230)
Sinchi Roca, Inca (c.1230–1260)
Lloque Yupanqui, Inca (c.1260–1290)
Mayta Cápac, Inca (c.1290–1320)

Asia

Asia: Central

Mongolia

Khamag Mongol (complete list) –
Genghis, Khan (1189–1206)

Mongol Empire (complete list) –
Genghis, Khan (1206–1227)
Tolui, Regent (1227–1229)
Ögedei, Khan (1229–1241)
Töregene Khatun, Regent (1243–1246)
Güyük, Khan (1246–1248)
Oghul Qaimish, Regent (1248–1251)
Möngke, Khan (1251–1259)
Ariq Böke, Khan (1259–1264)
Kublai, Khan (1260–1294), Emperor (1271–1294)
Temür, Khan / Emperor (1294–1307)	

Kazakhstan

Chagatai Khanate (complete list) –
Chagatai, Khan (1226–1242)
Qara Hülëgü, Khan (1242–1246, 1252)
Yesü Möngke, Khan (1246–1252)
Mubarak Shah, Khan (1252–1260, 1266)
Orghana, Khatun, Regent (1252–1260)
Alghu, Khan (1260–1266)
Baraq, Khan (1266–1270)
Nominal rulers under the Mongol Empire, 1270–1306
Negübei, Khan (1270–c.1272)
Buqa Temür, Khan (c.1272–1287)
Duwa, Khan (1287–1307)

Qara Khitai / Western Liao
Yelü Zhilugu, Sovereign (1178–1211)
Kuchlug, Sovereign (1211–1218)

Russia

Golden Horde (complete list) –
Batu Khan, Khan (1227–1255)
Sartaq, Khan (1255–56)
Ulaghchi, Khan (1257)
Berke, Khan (1257–1266)
Mengu-Timur, Khan (1266–1282)
Tuda Mengu, Khan (1282—1287)
Talabuga, Khan (1287—1291)
Toqta, Khan (1291—1312)

White Horde (complete list) –
Orda, Khan (1226–1251)
Qun Quran, Khan (1251–c.1280)

Blue Horde (complete list) –
Batu Khan, Khan (1227–1255)
Sartaq, Khan (1255–56)
Ulaghchi, Khan (1257)
Berke, Khan (1257–1266)
Mengu-Timur, Khan (1266–1282)
Tuda Mengu, Khan (1282—1287)
Talabuga, Khan (1287—1291)
Toqta, Khan (1291—1312)

Siberia

Khanate of Sibir (complete list) –
Taibuga, Khan (1220–?)
Khoja bin Taibugha, Khan (?)

Tibet

Guge
rNam lde btsan, King (12th/13th century)
Nyi ma lde, King (12th/13th century)
dGe 'bum, King (13th century)
La ga, King (?–c.1260)
Chos rgyal Grags pa, King (c.1260–1265)
Grags pa lde, King (c.1265–1277)

Asia: East

China: Mongol Empire / Yuan dynasty

Yuan dynasty (complete list) –
Temür, Khan / Emperor (1294–1307)	

China: Jin dynasty

Jin dynasty –
Zhangzong, Emperor (1189–1208)
Wanyan Yongji, Emperor (1208–1213)
Xuanzong, Emperor (1213–1224)
Aizong, Emperor (1224–1234)
Mo, Emperor (1234)

China: Yuan dynasty

Yuan dynasty (complete list) –
Temür, Khan / Emperor (1294–1307)

China: Other states and entities

Dali Kingdom (complete list) –
Duan Zhilian, Emperor (1200–1204)
Duan Zhixiang, Emperor (1204–1238)
Duàn Ziangxing, Emperor (1238–1251)
Duan Xingzhi, Emperor (1251–1254)

Western Xia –
Huánzōng, Emperor (1193–1206)
Xiāngzōng, Emperor (1206–1211)
Shénzōng, Emperor (1211–1223)
Xiànzōng, Emperor (1223–1226)
Mòdì, Emperor (1226–1227)

China: Southern Song

Song dynasty (complete list) –
Ningzong, Emperor (1194–1224) 
Lizong, Emperor (1224–1264) 
Duzong, Emperor (1264–1274) 
Gong, Emperor (1275) 
Duanzong, Emperor (1276–1278) 
Bing, Emperor (1278–1279)

Japan

Kamakura shogunate of Japan
Emperors (complete list) –
Tsuchimikado, Emperor (1198–1210)
Juntoku, Emperor (1210–1221)
Chūkyō, Emperor (1221)
Go-Horikawa, Emperor (1221–1232)
Shijō, Emperor (1232–1242)
Go-Saga, Emperor (1242–1246)
Go-Fukakusa, Emperor (1246–1260)
Kameyama, Emperor (1260–1274)
Go-Uda, Emperor (1274–1287)
Fushimi, Emperor (1287–1298)
Go-Fushimi, Emperor (1298–1301)
Shōguns (complete list) –
Minamoto no Yoriie, Shōgun (1202–1203)
Minamoto no Sanetomo, Shōgun (1203–1219)
Kujō Yoritsune, Shōgun (1226–1244)
Kujō Yoritsugu, Shōgun (1244–1252)
Prince Munetaka, Shōgun (1252–1266)
Prince Koreyasu, Shōgun (1266–1289)
Prince Hisaaki, Shōgun (1289–1308)
Regent of the shogunate (complete list) –
Hōjō Tokimasa, Shikken (1203–1205)
Hōjō Yoshitoki, Shikken (1205–1224)
Hōjō Yasutoki, Shikken (1224–1242)
Hōjō Tsunetoki, Shikken (1242–1246)
Hōjō Tokiyori, Shikken (1246–1256)
Hōjō Tokimune, Shikken (1268–1284)
Hōjō Sadatoki, Shikken (1284–1301)

Ryukyu Kingdom
Shunten Dynasty –
Shunten, Chief (1187–1237)
Shunbajunki, Chief (1238–1248)
Gihon, Chief (1249–1259)
Eiso Dynasty –
Eiso, Chief (1260–1299)
Taisei, Chief (1300–1308)

Korea

Goryeo (complete list) –
Sinjong, King (1197–1204)
Huijong, King (1204–1211)
Gangjong, King (1211–1213)
Gojong, King (1213–1259)
Wonjong, King (1259–1274)
Chungnyeol, King (1274–1298, 1298–1308)
Chungseon, King (1298, 1308–1313)

Asia: Southeast

Cambodia
Khmer Empire (complete list) –
Jayavarman VII, King (1181–1218)
Indravarman II, King (1218–1243)
Jayavarman VIII, King (1243–1295)
Indravarman III, King (1295–1307)

Indonesia

Indonesia: Java

Sunda Kingdom (complete list) –
Prabu Guru Dharmasiksa, Maharaja (1175–1297)
Rakeyan Saunggalah, Maharaja (1297–1303)

Kediri Kingdom –
Kertajaya, King (1200–1222)

Singhasari: Rajasa dynasty (complete list) –
Ken Arok, King (1222–1227)
Anusapati, King (1227–1248)
Panji Tohjaya, King (1248)0
Vishnuvardhana-Narasimhamurti, King (1248–1268)
Kertanegara, King (1268–1292)

Majapahit: Rajasa dynasty (complete list) –
Raden Wijaya, King (1294–1309)

Tuban –
Kyai Arya Papringan, King (13th century)
Raden Arya Rangga Lawe, King (c.1300)

Blambangan Kingdom (complete list) –
Aria Wiraraja, King (1293–?)

Indonesia: Sumatra

Dharmasraya: Mauli dynasty (complete list) –
Tribhuwanaraja, King (c.1286)
Akarendrawarman, King (c.1300)

Samudera Pasai Sultanate (complete list) –
Malikussaleh, Sultan (1267–1297)
Al-Malik azh-Zhahir I, Sultan (1297–1326)

Indonesia: Sulawesi
Luwu –
Batara Guru, Datu (13th century)
Batara Lattu’, Datu (1250s–1260s)
Simpurusiang, Datu (1268–1293)
Anakaji, Datu (1293–1330)

Indonesia: Lesser Sunda Islands
Bali Kingdom: Jaya dynasty (complete list) –
Arjayadengjayaketana, Queen (fl.1200)
Haji Ekajayalancana, King (co-regent fl.1200)
Bhatara Guru Śri Adikuntiketana, King (fl.1204)
Adidewalancana, King (fl.1260)
unknown Queen (?–1284)

Indonesia: Maluku Islands
Sultanate of Ternate (complete list) –
Baab Mashur Malamo, King (1257–1277)
Poit/ Jamin Qadrat, King (1277–1284)
Komala 'Abu Said/ Siale, King (1284–1298)
Bakuku/ Kalabata, King (1298–1304)

Malaysia: Peninsular

Kedah Sultanate (complete list) –
Mu'adzam Shah, Sultan, (1179–1202)
Muhammad Shah, Sultan, (1202–1237)
Muzzil Shah, Sultan, (1237–1280)
Mahmud Shah I, Sultan, (1280–1321)

Kelantan Sultanate: Jambi dynasty (complete list) –
Sang Tawal, Raja (1267–1339)

Myanmar / Burma

Pagan Kingdom (complete list) –
Narapatisithu (Sithu II), King (1174–1211)
Htilominlo, King (1211–1235)
Naratheinga Uzana, Regent (c.1231–1235)
Kyaswa, King (1235–1251)
Uzana, King (1251–1256)
Narathihapate, King (1256–1287)
Kyawswa, Mongol vassal King (1287–1297)

Myinsaing Kingdom (complete list) –
Athinkhaya, Co-Regent (1297–1310)
Yazathingyan, Co-Regent (1297–1313)
Thihathu, Co-Regent of Myinsaing (1297–1313), King of Myinsaing–Pinya (1313–1325)

Philippines

Ma-i (complete list) –
Gat Sa Li-han, King (mid 13th century)

Tondo (complete list) –
Alon, Rajah (13th century)

Lupah Sug (complete list) –
Sipad the Older, Rajah (13th century)
Sipad the Younger, Rajah (c.1280)

Madja-as (complete list) –
Puti, Datu (c.1200–1212)
Sumakwel, Datu (1213–?)
Bangkaya, Datu (13th century)
Paiburong, Datu (13th/14th century)

Singapore
Kingdom of Singapura –
Sang Nila Utama, Raja (1299–1347)

Thailand

Ngoenyang (complete list) –
Lao Ngoen Rueang, King (1192–early 13th century)
Lao Sin, King (early 13th century)
Lao Ming, King (early 13th century)
Lao Mueang, King (mid 13th century)
Lao Meng, King (mid 13th century)
Mangrai, King of Ngoenyang (1261–1292), King of Lan Na (1292–1311)

Lan Na (complete list) –
Mangrai, King of Ngoenyang (1261–1292), King of Lan Na (1292–1311)

Hariphunchai (complete list) –
Phanton, King (13th century)
Atana, King (13th century)
Havam, King (13th century)
Trangal, King (13th century)
Yotta, King (13th century)
Yip, King (13th century–1292)

Rajahnate of Cebu –
Lumay, Rajah (c.13th century)

Sukhothai Kingdom (complete list) –
Si Inthrathit, King (1238–1270)
Ban Mueang, King (1270–1271)
Ram Khamhaeng, King (1279–1298)
Loe Thai, King (1298–1323)

Vietnam

Champa (complete list) –
Vidyanandana, (Khmer vassal) King (1190–1203)
Cam Bốt thuộc, King (1203–1220)
Jaya Paramesvaravarman II, King (1220–c.1252)
Jaya Indravarman VI, King (c.1252–1257)
Indravarman V, King (1257–1288)
Chế Mân, King (1288–1307)

Đại Việt: Later Lý dynasty (complete list) –
Lý Cao Tông, Emperor (1176–1210)
Lý Thẩm, Emperor (1209–1209)
Lý Huệ Tông, Emperor (1211–1224)
Lý Nguyên Vương, Emperor (1214–1216)
Lý Chiêu Hoàng, Emperor (1224–1225)

Đại Việt: Trần dynasty (complete list) –
Trần Thái Tông, Emperor (1225–1258)
Trần Thánh Tông, Emperor (1258–1278)
Trần Nhân Tông, Emperor (1279–1293)
Trần Anh Tông, Emperor (1293–1314)

Asia: South

Afghanistan

Ghurid dynasty (complete list) –
Ghiyath al-Din Muhammad, Malik (1163–1203)
Muhammad of Ghor, Malik (1172–1206)
Ghiyath al-Din Mahmud, Malik (1206–1212)
Baha al-Din Sam III, Malik (1212–1213)
Ala al-Din Atsiz, Malik (1213–1214)
Ala al-Din Ali, Malik (1214–1215)

Bengal and Northeast India

Ahom kingdom (complete list) –
Sukaphaa, King (1228–1268)
Suteuphaa, King (1268–1281)
Subinphaa, King (1281–1293)
Sukhaangphaa, King (1293–1332)

Chutia Kingdom (complete list) –
Birpal, King (1187–1224)
Ratnadhwajpal, King (1224–1250)
Vijayadhwajpal, King (1250–1278)
Vikramadhwajpal, King (1278–1302)

Deva dynasty (complete list) –
Madhusudanadeva, King
Vasudeva, King
Damodaradeva, King (1231–1243)
Dasharathadeva, King (1260–1268)

Kamata Kingdom (complete list) –
Sandhya, King (1228–1260)
Sindhu Rai, King (1260–1285)
Rup Narayan, King (1285–1300)
Singhadhwaj, King (1300–1305)

Mallabhum (complete list) –
Ram Malla, King (1185–1209)
Bhim Malla, King (1240–1253)
Prithwi Malla, King (1295–1319)

Kingdom of Manipur (complete list) –
Thayanthapa, King (1195–1231)
Chingthang Lanthapa, King (1231–1242)
Thingpai Shelhongpa, King (1242–1247)
Pulanthapa, King (1247–1263)
Khumompa, King (1263–1278)
Moilampa, King (1278–1302)

Sena dynasty (complete list) –
Lakshmana Sena, King (1179–1206)
Vishvarupa Sena, King (1206–1225)
Keshava Sena, King (1225–1230)

Burma

Kengtung (complete list) –
Mang Kun, Saopha (mid-13th century)
Mang Kyin, Saopha (1267–1273)
Marquess of Kengtung, Saopha (1273–1284)
Sao Nannan, Saopha (1284–1317)

India

Amber Kingdom (complete list) –
Rajdeo, King (1179–1216)
Kilhan, King (1216–1276)
Kuntal, King (1276–1317)

Chandelas of Jejakabhukti (complete list) –
Paramardi-Deva, King (c.1165–1203)
Trailokya-Varman, King (c.1203–1245)
Vira-Varman, King (c.1245–1285)
Bhoja-Varman, King (c.1285–1288)
Hammira-Varman, King (c.1288–1311)

Chaulukya dynasty of Gujarat (complete list) –
Bhima II, King (1177–1240) 
Tribhuvanapala, King (1240–1244)

Chera/Perumals of Makotai (complete list) –
Vira Manikantha Rama Varma Tiruvadi, King (1195–?)
Vira Rama Kerala Varma Tiruvadi, King (1209–1214)
Vira Ravi Kerala Varma Tiruvadi, King (1214–1240)
Vira Padmanabha Martanda Varma Tiruvadi, King (1240–1252)
Ravi Varma, King (1299–1313)

Chola dynasty (complete list) –
Kulothunga Chola III, King (1178–1218)
Rajaraja Chola III, King (1218–1246)
Rajendra Chola III, King (1246–1280)

Chahamanas of Shakambhari (complete list) –
Vijayasimha, King (1188–1210)
Trailokya-malla, King (1210s)

Delhi Sultanate: Mamluk Sultanate (complete list) –
Qutb-ud-din Aibak, Sultan (1206–1210)
Aram Shah, Sultan (1210–1211)
Shams-ud-din Iltutmish, Sultan (1211–1236)
Rukn-ud-din Firuz, Sultan (1236)
Raziyyat ud din Sultana, Sultan (1236–1240)
Muiz-ud-din Bahram, Sultan (1240–1242)
Ala-ud-din Masud, Sultan (1242–1246)
Nasir-ud-din Mahmud, Sultan (1246–1266)
Ghiyas-ud-din Balban, Sultan (1266–1286)
Muiz-ud-din Qaiqabad, Sultan (1286–1290)
Shamsuddin Kayumars, Sultan (1290)

Delhi Sultanate: Khalji dynasty (complete list) –
Jalal ud din Firuz Khilji, Sultan (1290–1296)
Alauddin Khilji, Sultan (1296–1316)

Eastern Ganga dynasty (complete list) –
Rajaraja Deva III, King (1198–1211)
Ananga Bhima Deva III, King (1211–1238)
Narasimha Deva I, King (1238–1264)
Bhanu Deva I, King (1264–1279)
Narasimha Deva II, King (1279–1306)

Garhwal Kingdom (complete list) –
Lakhan Dev, King (1197–1220)
Anand Pal II, King (1220–1241)
Purva Dev, King (1241–1260)
Abhay Dev, King (1260–1267)
Jayaram Dev, King (1267–1290)
Asal Dev, King (1290–1299)
Jagat Pal, King (1299–1311)

Hoysala Empire (complete list) –
Veera Ballala II, King (1173–1220)
Vira Narasimha II, King (1220–1235)
Vira Someshwara, King (1235–1263)
Narasimha III, King (1263–1292)
Veera Ballala III, King (1292–1343)

Jaisalmer (complete list) –
Kailan Singh, Rawal (1200–1219)
Chachak Deo Singh, Rawal (1219–1241)
Karan Singh I, Rawal (1241–1271)
Lakhan Sen, Rawal (1271–1275)
Punpal Singh, Rawal (1275–1276)
Jaitsi Singh I, Rawal (1276–1294)
Mulraj Singh I, Rawal (1294–1295)
Durjan Sal (Duda), Rawal (1295–1306)

Kadava dynasty (complete list) –
Kopperunchinga I, King (c.1216–1242)
Kopperunchinga II, King (c.1243–1279)

Kahlur (complete list) –
Sangar Chand, Raja (1197–1220)
Megh Chand, Raja (1220–1251)
Dev Chand, Raja (late 13th century)
Ahim Chand, Raja (late 13th century)

Kakatiya dynasty (complete list) –
Ganapati-deva, King (c.1199–1262)
Rudrama-devi, King (c.1262–1289)
Prataparudra-deva, King (c.1289–1323)

Kalachuris of Tripuri (complete list) –
Vijayasimha, King (1188–1210)
Trailokya-malla, King (c.1210–post-1211)

Kumaon Kingdom: Chand (complete list) –
Ram Chand, King (1195–1205)
Bhishm Chand, King (1205–1226)
Megh Chand, King (1226–1233)
Dhyan Chand, King (1233–1251)
Parvat Chand, King (1251–1261)
Thor Chand, King (1261–1275)
Kalyan Chand II, King (1275–1296)
Trilok Chand, King (1296–1303)

Kingdom of Kutch (complete list) –
Ratto Rayadhan, King (1175–?)
Othaji, King (1215–?)
Gaoji, King (1255–?)
Vehanji, King (1285–?)

Kingdom of Marwar (complete list) –
Siha, Rao (1226–1273)
Asthan, Rao (1273–1292)
Doohad, Rao (1292–1309)

Pandyan dynasty (complete list) –
Sadayavarman Kulasekaran I, King (1190–1216)
Parakrama Pandyan II, King (1212–1215) 
Maravarman Sundara Pandyan, King (1216–1238)
Sadayavarman Kulasekaran II, King (1238–1240)
Maravarman Sundara Pandyan II, King (1238–1251)
Sadayavarman Vikkiraman I, King (1241–1250)
Maravarman Vikkiraman II, King (1250–1251)
Jatavarman Sundara Pandyan I, King (1251–1268)
Jatavarman Vira Pandyan II, co-King (1253–1275)
Maravarman Kulasekara Pandyan I, King (1268–1308)

Paramaras of Chandravati (complete list) –
Dhara-varsha, King (c.1160–1220)

Paramara dynasty of Malwa (complete list) –
Subhatavarman, King (1194–1209)
Arjunavarman I, King (1210–1215)
Devapala, King (1218–1239)
Jaitugideva, King (1239–1255
Jayavarman II, King (1255–1274)
Arjunavarman II, King (c.1275–post-1283)
Bhoja II, King (post-1283–?)
Mahlakadeva, King (?–1305)

Seuna (Yadava) dynasty (complete list) –
Jaitugi I, King (c.1191–1200/10)
Simhana II, King (c.1200/10–1246)
Krishna, King (c.1246–1261)
Mahadeva, King (c.1261–1270)
Ammana, King (c.1270)
Ramachandra, King (c.1271–1308)

Sisodia (complete list) –
Khumar, Manthan, Padam Singh, Rajput (1179–1213)
Jaitra Singh, Rajput (1213–1261)
Teja Singh, Rajput (1261–1273)
Samar Singh, Rajput (1273–1301)

Vaghela dynasty (complete list) –
Visala-deva, King (c.1244–c.1262)
Arjuna-deva, King (c.1262–c.1275)
Rama, King (c.1275)
Saranga-deva, King (c.1275–c.1296)
Karna, King (c.1296–c.1304)

Yajvapala dynasty (complete list) –
Chahada-deva, King (c.1237–1254) These coins are dated in Vikrama Samvat. They feature a horseman on one side, and the legend Srimat Chahadadeva on the other side.
Asalla-deva, King (c.1254–1279) These coins also feature a horseman.

Maldives

Sultanate of the Maldives: Theemuge dynasty (complete list) –
Wadi, Sultan (1214–1233)
Valla Dio, Sultan (1233–1258)
Hudhei, Sultan (1258–1264)
Aima, Sultan (1264–1266)
Hali I, Sultan (1266–1268)
Keimi, Sultan (1268–1269)
Audha, Sultan (1269–1278)
Hali II, Sultan (1278–1288)
Yoosuf I, Sultan (1288–1294)
Salis, Sultan (1294–1302)

Nepal

Khasa kingdom
Grags pa lde (Kradhicalla), King (fl.1225)
A sog lde (Ashokacalla), King (fl.1255–1278)
'Ji dar sMal (Jitarimalla), King (fl.1287–1293)
A nan sMal (Anandamalla), King (late 13th century)

Malla (Kathmandu Valley) (complete list) –
Ari Deva, King (c.1201–1216)
Abhaya Malla, King (c.1216–1255)
Ranasura, King (c.1216)
Jayadeva Malla, King (c.1255–1258)
Jayabhima Deva, King (c.1258–1271)
Jayasimha Malla, King (c.1271–1274)
Ananta Malla, King (c.1274–1310)

Sri Lanka

Kingdom of Dambadeniya (complete list) –
Vijayabahu III, King (1220–1224)
Parakkamabahu II, King (1234–1269)
Vijayabahu IV, King (1267/8–1270)
Bhuvanaikabahu I, King (1271–1283)

Jaffna Kingdom (complete list) –
Kalinga Magha, King (1215–1255)
Chandrabhanu, King (1255–1262)
Savakanmaindan, King (1262–1277)
Kulasekara Cinkaiariyan, King (1262–1284)
Kulotunga Cinkaiariyan, King (1284–1292)
Vickrama Cinkaiariyan, King (1292–1302)

Kingdom of Polonnaruwa (complete list) –
Lilavati, King (1197–1200, 1209–1210, 1211–1212)
Sahassa Malla, King (1200–1202)
Kalyanavati, King (1202–1208)
Dharmasoka, King (1208–1209)
Anikanga, King (1209–1209)
Lokissara, King (1210–1211)
Parakrama Pandya, King (1212–1215)
Kalinga Magha, King (1215–1236)

Asia: West

Mesopotamia

Abbasid Caliphate, Baghdad (complete list) –
al-Nasir, Caliph (1180–1225)
az-Zahir, Caliph (1225–1226)
al-Mustansir, Caliph (1226–1242)
al-Musta'sim, Caliph (1242–1258)
to Cairo 

Turkey

Ottoman Empire (complete list) –
Osman I, Sultan (c.1299–1326)

Yemen

Yemeni Zaidi State (complete list) –
al-Mansur Abdallah, Imam (1187–1217)
an-Nasir Muhammad bin Abdallah, Imam (1217–1226)
al-Hadi Yahya, Imam (1217–1239)
al-Mahdi Ahmad bin al-Husayn, Imam (1248–1258)
al-Hasan bin Wahhas, Imam (1258–1260)
Yahya bin Muhammad as-Siraji, Imam (1261–1262)
al-Mansur al-Hasan, Imam (1262–1271)
al-Mahdi Ibrahim, Imam (1272–1276)
al-Mutawakkil al-Mutahhar bin Yahya, Imam (1276–1298)

Europe

Europe: Balkans

Bulgaria

Second Bulgarian Empire (complete list) –
Kaloyan, Emperor (1197–1207)
Boril, Emperor (1207–1218)
Ivan Asen II, Emperor (1218–1241)
Kaliman I, Emperor (1241–1246)
Michael II, Emperor (1246–1256)
Kaliman Asen II, Emperor (1256)
Mitso Asen, Emperor (1256–1257)
Konstantin Tih, Emperor (1257–1277)
Ivailo, Emperor (1278–1279)
Ivan Asen III, Emperor (1279–1280)
George Terter I, Emperor (1280–1292)
Smilets, Emperor (1292–1298)
Ivan II, Emperor (1298–1299)
Chaka, Emperor (1299–1300)
Theodore Svetoslav, Emperor (1300–1322)

Byzantium

Byzantine Empire (complete list) –
Alexios III Angelos, Emperor (1195–1203)
Alexios IV Angelos, Emperor (1203–1204)
Nicholas Kanabos, Emperor-elect (1204) as usurper chosen by the Senate
Alexios V Doukas, Emperor (1204)

Latin Empire (complete list) –
Baldwin I, Emperor (1204–1205)
Henry, Emperor (1206–1216)
Peter, Emperor (1216–1217)
Yolanda, Regent (1217–1219)
Conon de Béthune, Regent (1219)
Giovanni Colonna, Regent (1220–1221)
Robert I, Emperor (1221–1228)
Baldwin II, Emperor (1228–1261)
John of Brienne, Senior co-Emperor (1229–1237)

Principality of Achaea (complete list) –
William I, Prince (1205–1209)
Geoffrey I, Prince (1209/10–c.1229)
Geoffrey II, Prince (c.1229–1246)
William II, Prince (1246–1278)
Charles I, Prince (1278–1285)
Charles II, Prince (1285–1289)
Isabella, Princess (1289–1307)
Florent, Prince (1289–1297)

Duchy of the Archipelago (complete list) –
Marco I Sanudo, Duke (1207–1227)
Angelo, Duke (1227–1262)
Marco II, Duke (1262–1303)

Byzantine Empire (complete list) –
Michael VIII Palaiologos, Emperor (1261–1282)
Andronikos II Palaiologos, Emperor (1282–1328)
Michael IX Palaiologos, co-Emperor (1294–1320)

Serbia

Grand Principality / Kingdom of Serbia (complete list) –
Stefan the First-Crowned, Grand Prince (1196–1202, 1204–1217), King (1217–1228)
Vukan Nemanjić, Grand Prince (1202–1204)
Stefan Radoslav, King (1228–1233)
Stefan Vladislav, King (1233–1243)
Stefan Uroš I, King (1243–1276)
Stefan Dragutin, King of Serbia (1276–1282), King of Syrmia (1282–1316)
Stefan Milutin, King (1282–1321)

Kingdom of Syrmia (complete list) –
Stefan Dragutin, King of Serbia (1276–1282), King of Syrmia (1282–1316)

Europe: British Isles

Scotland

Kingdom of Scotland/ Kingdom of Alba (complete list) –
William I the Lion, King (1165–1214)
Alexander II, King (1214–1249)
Alexander III, King (1249–1286)
Margaret, Queen (1286–1290) 
Guardian of Scotland (1290–1292)
John, King (1292–1296)

Kingdom of the Isles: Mann and the North Isles (complete list) –
Rǫgnvaldr Guðrøðarson, King (1187–1226)
Óláfr Guðrøðarson, the Black, King (1226–1237)
Óspakr-Hákon, King (c.1230)
Guðrøðr Rǫgnvaldsson, King (c.1231)
Haraldr Óláfsson, King (1237–1248)
Rǫgnvaldr Óláfsson, King (1249)
Haraldr Guðrøðarson, King (1249–1250)
Magnús Óláfsson, King (1254–1265)

Kingdom of the Isles: The South Isles (complete list) –
Ragnall mac Somairle, King (1164–1207)
Donnchadh of Argyll, King (1221/25–c.1244/48)
Dubgall mac Dubgaill, King (?)
Somairle mac Dubgaill, King (?–1230)
Eóghan of Argyll, King (c.1244/48–c.1268)
Dubhghall mac Ruaidhrí, King (1249–1266)

Wales

Deheubarth (complete list) –
Gruffydd ap Rhys II, ruler (1197–1201)
Maelgwn ap Rhys, ruler (1199–1230)
Rhys Gryg, ruler (1216–1234)
Rhys Mechyll, ruler (1234–1244)
Maredudd ap Rhys, ruler (1244–1271)
Rhys ap Maredudd, ruler (1271–1283)

England and Ireland

Kingdom of England and Lordship of Ireland (complete list) –
John, King (1199–1216), Lord (1177–1216)
Louis, disputed King (1216–1217)
Henry III, King and Lord (1216–1272)
Edward I, King and Lord (1272–1307)

Ireland

Airgíalla (complete list) –
Ua Eichnigh, King (?–1201)
Giolla Pádraig Ó hAnluain, King (1201–1243)
Eochaid mac Mathgahamna mac Neill, King (?–1273)
Brian mac Eochada, King (1283–1311)

Kingdom of Breifne (complete list) –
Domnall Ó Ruairc, Lord (c.1207)
Ualgarg Ó Ruairc, King (c.1196–1209)
Art Ó Ruairc, King (1209–1210)
Niall O'Ruairc, King (1228)
Ualgarg Ó Ruairc, King (c.1210–1231)
Cathal riabach O'Ruairc, King (1231–1236)
Conchobar O'Ruairc, King (c.1250–1257)

East Breifne (complete list) –
Cathal Ua Raghallaigh, Lord (1256)
Con Ua Raghallaigh, Chief (1256–1257)
Matha Ua Raghallaigh, Lord (1282)
Ferghal O'Raigillig, ruler (1282–1293)

West Breifne (complete list) –
Sitric Ó Ruairc, King (1257–1257)
Amlaíb Ó Ruairc, King (1257–1258)
Domnall Ó Ruairc, King (1258–1258)
Art Ó Ruairc, King (1258–1259)
Domnall Ó Ruairc, King (1259–1260)
Art Bec Ó Ruairc, King (1260–1260)
Art Ó Ruairc, King (1261–1266)
Conchobar Buide Ó Ruairc, King (1266–1273)
Tigernán Ó Ruairc, King (1273–1274)
Art Ó Ruairc, King (1275–1275)
Amlaib Ó Ruairc, King (c.1275–1307)

Connachta (complete list) –
Cathal Carragh Ua Conchobair, King (1190–1202)
Mathghamhain mac Conchobar Maenmaige Ua Conchobair, King (?)
Muirchertach Tethbhach, King (?)
Donnchadh Conallagh Ua Conchobair, King (?)
Tadhg mac Conchobar Maenmaige Ua Conchobair, King (?)
Mael Seachlainn mac Conchobar Maenmaige Ua Conchobair, King (?)
Aodh mac Conchobar Maenmaige Ua Conchobair, King (?)
Aedh Ua Conchobair, King (?)
Felim Ua Conchobair, King (?)
Aedh mac Felim Ó Conchobair, King (?)
Aedh Muimhnech Ó Conchobair, King (?)
Aedh Ó Conchobair, King (1293–1309)

Leinster (complete list) –
Domhnall Óg mac Domhnall Caomhánach, King (?)
Muirchertach mac Domhnall Óg mac Murchada Caomhánach, King (?–1282)
Muiris mac Muirchertach mac Murchada Caomhánach, King (1282–1314)

Magh Luirg (complete list) –
Tomaltach na Cairge MacDermot, King (1196–1207)
Cathal Carrach mac Diarmata, King (1207–1215)
Dermot mac Diarmata, King (1215–1218)
Cormac mac Diarmata, King (1218–1244)
Muirchertach mac Diarmata, King (1245–1265)
Tadhg mac Diarmata, King (1256–1281)
Dermot Mideach mac Diarmata, King (1281–1287)
Cathal mac Diarmata, King (1288–1294)
Maelruanaidh mac Diarmata, King (1294–1331)

Síol Anmchadha (complete list) –
Diarmaid Cleirech Ua Madadhan, King (1188–1207)
Madudan Óg Ó Madadhan, King (1207–1235 )
Cathal Ó Madadhan, King (1235–1286)
Murchadh Ó Madadhan, Lord (1286–1327)

Uí Maine (complete list) –
Domnall Mór Ua Cellaigh, King (?–1221)

Europe: Central

See also List of state leaders in the 13th-century Holy Roman Empire

Holy Roman Empire, Kingdom of Germany (complete list, complete list) –
Otto IV, Holy Roman Emperor (1209–1215), King (1198–1209)
Philip, King (1198–1208)
Otto IV, King (1198–1209)
Frederick II, Holy Roman Emperor (1220–1250), King (1212–1220)
Conrad IV, contender King (1237–1254)
Henry Raspe, rival King (1246–1247)
William II of Holland, rival King (1247–1256)
Richard of Cornwall, contender King (1257–1272)
Alfonso X, rival King (1257–1275)
Rudolf I, contender King (1273–1291)
Adolf, King (1292–1298)
Albert I, King (1298–1308)

Hungary

Kingdom of Hungary (1000–1301) (complete list) –
Emeric, King (1196–1204)
Ladislaus III, King (1204–1205)
Andrew II, King (1205–1235)
Béla IV, King (1235–1270)
Stephen V, King (1270–1272)
Ladislaus IV, King (1272–1290)
Andrew III, King (1290–1301)

Poland

Seniorate Province in the Fragmentation of Poland (complete list) –
Leszek the White, High Duke (1194–1198, 1199–1202, 1206–1210, 1211–1227)
Mieszko III the Old, High Duke (1173–1177, 1191, 1198–1199, 1202)
Władysław III Spindleshanks, High Duke (1202–1206, 1227–1229)
Mieszko IV Tanglefoot, High Duke (1210–1211)
Konrad I, High Duke (1229–1232, 1241–1243)
Henry the Bearded, High Duke (1232–1238)
Henry II the Pious, High Duke (1238–1241)
Bolesław the Horned, High Duke (1288, 1289)
Bolesław V the Chaste, High Duke (1243–1279)
Leszek II the Black, High Duke (1279–1288)
Henryk IV Probus, High Duke (1288–1289, 1289–1290)
Władysław I Łokietek, High Duke (1289)
Przemysł II, High Duke (1290–1291), King (1295–1296)
Wenceslaus II, High Duke (1291–1300), King (1300–1305)

Duchy of Opole (complete list) –
Jarosław Opolski, Duke (1173–1201)
Bolesław I the Tall, Duke (1201)
Henry I the Bearded, Duke (1201–1202)
Mieszko I Tanglefoot, Duke (1202–1211)
Casimir I, Duke (1211–1230)
Mieszko II the Fat, Duke (1230–1246)
Władysław I, Duke (1246–1281)
Bolko I, Duke (1281–1313)

Duchy of Masovia (complete list) –
Konrad I, Duke (1200–1247)
Bolesław I, Duke (1247–1248)
Siemowit I, Duke (1248–1262)
Pereyaslava of Halych, Regent (1248–1264)
Bolesław the Pious, Duke (1262–1264)
Konrad II, Duke of Masovia (1264–1275), Duke of Czersk (1275–1294)
Bolesław II, Duke of Płock (1275–1294), Duke of Masovia (1294–1313)

State of the Teutonic Order (complete list) –
Heinrich Walpot, Grand Master (1198–pre-1208)
Otto von Kerpen, Grand Master (fl.1208)
Heinrich von Tunna, Grand Master (1208–1209)
Hermann von Salza, Grand Master (1209–1239)
Konrad von Thüringen, Grand Master (1239–1240)
Gerhard von Malberg, Grand Master (1240–1244)
Heinrich von Hohenlohe, Grand Master (1244–1249)
, Grand Master (1249–1252)
Poppo von Osterna, Grand Master (1252–1256)
Anno von Sangershausen, Grand Master (1256–1273)
Hartmann von Heldrungen, Grand Master (1273–1282)
Burchard von Schwanden, Grand Master (1283–1290)
Konrad von Feuchtwangen, Grand Master (1290–1297)
Gottfried von Hohenlohe, Grand Master (1297–1303)

Europe: East

Blue Horde (complete list) –
Orda, Khan (1226–1251)
Qun Quran, Khan (1251–1280)
Köchü, Khan (1280–1302)

Kievan Rus' (complete list) –
Rurik II, Grand Prince (1194–1202)
Igor III, Grand Prince (1202)
Rurik II, Grand Prince (1203–1206)
Roman II the Great, Grand Prince (1203–1206)
Rostislav II, Grand Prince (1203–1206)
Vsevolod IV the Red, Grand Prince (1206–1207)
Rurik II, Grand Prince (1207–1210)
Vsevolod IV the Red, Grand Prince (1210–1212)
Igor III, Grand Prince (1212–1214)
Mstislav III, Grand Prince (1214–1223)
Vladimir IV, Grand Prince (1223–1235)
Iziaslav IV, Grand Prince (1235–1236)
Yaroslav III, Grand Prince (1236–1238)
Michael II, Grand Prince (1238–1239)

Grand Duchy of Lithuania (complete list) –
Mindaugas, King (1253–1263), Grand Duke (1263–1251)
Treniota, Grand Duke (000–000)
Vaišvilkas, Grand Duke (000–000)
Shvarn, Grand Duke (000–000)
Traidenis, Grand Duke (000–000)
Daumantas, Grand Duke (000–000) 
Butigeidis, Grand Duke (000–000)
Butvydas, Grand Duke (000–000)
Vytenis, Grand Duke (000–000)
Gediminas, Grand Duke (000–000)
Jaunutis, Grand Duke (000–000)
Algirdas, Grand Duke (000–000)
Jogaila, Grand Duke (000–000)
Kęstutis, Grand Duke (000–000)
Skirgaila, Grand Duke (000–000)
Vytautas, Grand Duke (000–000)
Švitrigaila, Grand Duke (000–000)
Sigismund Kęstutaitis, Grand Duke (000–000)
Casimir Jagellon, Grand Duke (000–000)
Alexander, Grand Duke (1492–1506)
Sigismund I the Old, Grand Duke (1506–1548)
Sigismund II Augustus, Grand Duke (1530–1572)

Grand Duchy of Moscow (complete list) –
Daniel of Moscow, Grand prince (1283–1303)

Vladimir-Suzdal (complete list) –
Vsevolod the Big Nest, Grand Duke (1176–1212)
Yuri II, Grand Duke (1212–1216, 1218–1238)
Konstantin of Rostov, Grand Duke (1216–1218)
Yaroslav II, Grand Duke (1238–1246)
Sviatoslav III, Grand Duke (1246–1248, 1248–1249)
Mikhail Khorobrit, Grand Duke (1248)
Andrey II, Grand Duke (1249–1252)
Alexander I, Grand Duke (1252–1263)
Yaroslav III, Grand Duke (1264–1271)
Vasily of Kostroma, Grand Duke (1272–1277)
Dmitry of Pereslavl, Grand Duke (1277–1281, 1283–1293)
Andrey III, Grand Duke (1281–1283, 1293–1304)

Principality of Wallachia (complete list) –
Radu Negru, Prince (c.1290–1310)

Europe: Nordic

Denmark

Denmark (complete list) – 
Canute VI, King (1182–1202)
Valdemar II, King (?) / Valdemar the Young, King (?)
Eric IV, King (?)
Abel, King (?)
Christopher I, King (?)
Eric V, King (?)
Eric VI, King (1286–1319)

Duchy of Schleswig (complete list) –
Valdemar II of Denmark, Duke (1183–1216)
Valdemar the Young, Duke (1209–1216)
Eric IV of Denmark, Duke (1216–1232)
Abel, King of Denmark, Duke (1232–1252)
Valdemar III, Duke of Schleswig, Duke (1253–1257)
Eric I, Duke of Schleswig, Duke (1260–1272)
Valdemar IV, Duke of Schleswig, Duke (1283–1312)

Norway 

Kingdom of Norway (872–1397) (complete list) –
Sverre, King (1184–1202)
Haakon III, King (1202–1204)
Guttorm, King (1204)
Inge II, King (1204–1217)
Haakon IV, King (1217–1263)
Haakon the Young, co-King (1240–1257)
Magnus VI, King (1263–1280)
Eric II, King (1280–1299)
Haakon V, King (1299–1319)

Sweden

Sweden (800–1521) (complete list) –
Sverker II, King (1195/96–1208)
Eric X, King (1208–1216)
John I, King (1216–1222)
Eric XI, King (1222–1229, 1234–1250)
Canute II the Tall, King (1229–1234)
Valdemar, King (1250–1275)
Magnus III, King (1275–1290)
Birger, King (1290–1318)

Europe: Southcentral

See also List of state leaders in the 13th-century Holy Roman Empire#Italy

Kingdom of Italy (Holy Roman Empire) (complete list) –
Otto IV, King (1209–1212)
Frederick II, King (1212–1250)

Margraviate of Modena, Reggio, and Ferrara (complete list) –
Obizzo II, Marquis of Ferrara (1264–1293), of Modena and Reggio (1288/89–1293)
Azzo VIII, Marquis of Reggio (1293–1306), of Ferrara (1293–1308)
Aldobrandino II, Marquis of Modena (1293-1308), of Ferrara (1308–1326)

March of Montferrat (complete list) –
Boniface I, Marquis (1192–1207)
William VI, Marquis (1207–1225)
Boniface II, Marquis (1225–1253/55)
William VII, Marquis (1253/55–1292)
John I, Marquis (1292–1305)

Papal States (complete list) –
Innocent III, Pope (1198–1216)
Honorius III, Pope (1216–1227)
Gregory IX, Pope (1227–1241)
Celestine IV, Pope (1241)
Innocent IV, Pope (1243–1254)
Alexander IV, Pope (1254–1261)
Urban IV, Pope (1261–1264)
Clement IV, Pope (1265–1268)
Gregory X, Pope (1271–1276)
Innocent V, Pope (1276)
Adrian V, Pope (1276)
John XXI, Pope (1276–1277)
Nicholas III, Pope (1277–1280)
Martin IV, Pope (1281–1285)
Honorius IV, Pope (1285–1287)
Nicholas IV, Pope (1288–1292)
Celestine V, Pope (1294)
Boniface VIII, Pope (1294–1303)

San Marino
Captains Regent (1243–1500) –
Oddone Scarito, Filippo da Sterpeto, Captains Regent (1243–1244)
Oddone Scarito, Andrea Superchj, Captains Regent (1253)
Taddeo di Giovani Ardelj, Captain Regent (1254)
Ugolino Baracone, Captain Regent (1286)

Republic of Venice (complete list) –
Enrico Dandolo, Doge (1192–1205)
Pietro Ziani, Doge (1205–1229)
Jacopo Tiepolo, Doge (1229–1249)
Marino Morosini, Doge (1249–1252)
Reniero Zeno, Doge (1252–1268)
Lorenzo Tiepolo, Doge (1268–1275)
Jacopo Contarini, Doge (1275–1280)
Giovanni Dandolo, Doge (1280–1289)
Pietro Gradenigo, Doge (1289–1311)

Southern Italy

Kingdom of Sicily (complete list) –
Frederick I, King (1198–1250)
Henry II, King (1212–1217)
Conrad I, King (1250–1254)
Conradin, King (1254–1258)
Manfred, King (1258–1266)
Charles I, King (1266–1282/85)
split into Naples and the island of Sicily

Kingdom of Naples (complete list) –
Charles I, King (1282–1285)
Charles II the Lame, King (1285–1309)

Kingdom of Trinacria: Sicily (complete list) –
Peter I, King (1282–1285)
James II, King (1285–1295)
Frederick II, King (1295–1337)

Principality of Taranto (complete list) –
Walter III of Brienne, Prince (1200–1205)
Frederick, Prince (1205–1250)
Manfred of Sicily, Prince (1250–1266)
Charles I, Prince (1266–1285)
Charles II, Prince (1285–1294)
Philip I, Prince (1294–1331)

Europe: Southwest

Iberian Peninsula: Christian

Crown of Aragon (complete list) –
Peter II, King (1196–1213)
James I, King (1213–1276)
Peter III, King (1276–1285)
Alfonso III, King (1285–1291)
James II, King (1291–1327)

Kingdom / Crown of Castile (complete list) –
Alfonso VIII the Noble, King (1158–1214)
Henry I, King (1214–1217)
Berengaria the Great, King (1217–1217)
Ferdinand III the Saint, King (1217–1252)
Alfonso X the Wise, King (1252–1284)
Sancho IV the Brave, King (1284–1295)
Ferdinand IV the Summoned, King (1295–1312)

County of Barcelona (complete list) –
Peter II, Count (1196–1213)
James I, Count (1213–1276)
Peter II, Count (1276–1285)
Alphonse II, Count (1285–1291)
James II, Count (1291–1327)

Kingdom of Navarre (complete list) –
Sancho VII, King (1194–1234)
Theobald I, King (1234–1253)
Theobald II, King (1253–1270)
Henry I, King (1270–1274)
Joan I, Queen (1274–1305)
Philip I, King (1284–1305)

Kingdom of Portugal (complete list) –
Sancho I, King (1185–1212)
Afonso II, King (1212–1223)
Sancho II, King (1223–1247)
Afonso III, King (1248–1279)
Denis I, King (1279–1325)

Marca Hispanica

Andorra
Episcopal Co-Princes (complete list) –
Pere d'Urtx, Episcopal Co-Prince (1269–1293)
Guillem de Montcada, Episcopal Co-Prince (1295–1308)
French Co-Princes (complete list) –
Roger-Bernard III, French Co-Prince (1278–1302)

County of Cerdanya (complete list) –
Sancho I, Count (1168–1223)
Nuño, Count (1223–1242)
James I, Count (1242–1276)
James II, Count (1276–1311)

County of Urgell (complete list) –
Ermengol VIII of Sant Hilari, Count (1184–1208/1209)
Aurembiaix, Countess (1208/1209–1213, 1228–1231), from 1229 with her husband, Peter
Guerau I of Urgell, (usurper) Count (1213–1228)
James I of Aragon, Count (1231–1236)
Ponç I, Count (1236–1243)
Ermengol IX, Count (1243)
Álvaro the Castilian, Count (1243–1268)
Ermengol X, Count (1268–1314)

Europe: West

France

Kingdom of France (complete list) –
Philip II Augustus, King (1180–1223)
Louis VIII the Lion, King (1223–1226)
Louis IX the Saint, King (1226–1270)
Philip III the Bold, King (1270–1285)
Philip IV, King (1285–1314)

County of Angoulême (complete list) –
Aymer III, Count (1186–1202)
Isabella, Countess (1202–1246)
John of England, Count (1202–1216)

Anjou (complete list) –
John I Tristan, Count (1219–1232)
Margaret, Countess (1285–1299)
Philip, Count (1293–1328)

Duchy of Aquitaine (complete list) –
John I, Duke (1199–1216)
Henry II, Duke (Henry III of England)(1216–1272)
Edward I Longshanks, Duke (1272–1307)

County of Artois (complete list) –
Louis VIII of France, Count (1190–1223)
Robert I, Count (1237–1250)
Robert II, Count (1250–1302)

Auvergne (complete list) –
Guy II of Auvergne, Count (1195–1224)
William X of Auvergne, Count (1224–1246)
Robert V, count of Auvergne, Count (1246–1277)
William XI of Auvergne, Count (1277–1279)
Robert VI, count of Auvergne, Count (1279–1317)

County of Boulogne (complete list) –
Ida, Countess (1173–1216)
Matilda II, Countess (1216–1260)
Philip I, Count (1223–1235)
Afonso, Count (1235–1253)
Adelaide, Count (1260–1261)
Robert I, Count (1261–1277)
Robert II, Count (1277–1314)

Bourbonnais (complete list) –
Archambaud VIII de Bourbon, Lord (1218–1242)
Archambaud IX de Bourbon, Lord (1242–1249)
, Lady (1249–1262)
, Lady (1262–1287)
, Lady (1287–1310)

Duchy of Brittany (complete list) –
Guy of Thouars, Duke (1199–1201)
Arthur I, Duke (1196–1203)
Alix, Duchess (1203–1221)
Peter I, Duke (1213–1221)
John I, Duke (1221–1286)
John II, Duke (1286–1305)

Duchy of Burgundy (complete list) –
Odo III, Duke (1192–1218)
Hugh IV, Duke (1218–1271)
Robert II, Duke (1271–1306)

County of Champagne (complete list) –
Theobald III, Count (1197–1201)
Theobald IV, Count (1201–1253)
Theobald V, Count (1253–1270)
Henry III, Count (1270–1274)
Joan, Countness (1274–1305)
Louis, Count (1305–1316)

County of Flanders (complete list) –
Baldwin IX, Count (1194–1205)
Joan I, Countess (1205–1244)
Ferdinand of Portugal, Count (1212–1233)
Thomas of Savoy-Piedmont, Count (1237–1244)
Margaret II, Countess (1244–1278)
William I, Count (1247–1251)
Guy I, Count (1251–1305)

Duchy of Gascony (complete list) –
Eleanor of Aquitaine, Duchess (1137–1204)

County of Maine (complete list) –
John Lackland, Count (1200–1205)
Arthur I of Brittany, Count (1186–1203)
John Tristan, Count (1219–1232)
Charles I, Count (1246–1285)
Charles II, Count (1285–1325)

Monaco (complete list) –
Rainier I, Lord (1297–1301)

County of Nevers (complete list) –
Matilda I, Countess (1192–1257)
Hervé IV of Donzy, Count (1199–1223)
Guigues of Forez, Count (1226–1241)
Matilda II, Countess (1257–1262)
Odo, Count (1257–1262)
Yolande II, Countess (1262–1280)
John Tristan, Count (1265–1270)
Robert III of Bethune, Count (1272–1280)
Louis I, Count (1280–1322)

County of Poitou (complete list) –
Richard II, Count (1224)
Alphonse I, Count (1220–1271)
Philip I, Count (1293–1322)

County of Toulouse (complete list) –
Raymond VI (VIII), Count (1194–1222)
opposed by Simon IV de Montfort, Count (1215–1218)
Raymond VII (IX), Count (1222–1249)
Joan & Alphonse, Count of Poitiers, Countess & Count (1249–1271)

Eurasia: Caucasus

Kingdom of Georgia (complete list) –
Tamar the Great, Queen (1178–1213)
George IV, King (1207–1223)
Rusudan, Queen (1223–1245)
David VI Narin, King (1245–1259)

Kingdom of Imereti (complete list) –
David VI Narin, King (1259–1293)
Vakhtang II, King (1289–1292)
Constantine I, King (1293–1327)

Gazikumukh Khanate (complete list) –
Badr I, Shamkhal (1295–1304)

Eastern Georgia (complete list) –
David VII Ulu, King (1247–1270)
Demetrius II, King (1270–1289)
David VIII, King (1292–1302, 1308–1311)
George V, King (1299–1302, 1314–1346)

Oceania

Chile: Easter Island

Easter Island (complete list) –
Tu Te Rei Manana, King (c.1200)
Ko Te Kura Tahonga, King (?)
Taoraha Kaihahanga, King (?)
Tukuma(kuma), King (?)
Te Kahui Tuhunga, King (?)
Te Tuhunga Hanui, King (?)

Tonga

Tuʻi Tonga Empire (complete list) –
Talaihaʻapepe, King (?)
Talakaifaiki, King (c.1250)
Talafāpite, King (?)
Tuʻitonga Maʻakitoe, King (?)

United States: Hawaii

Island of Hawaiʻi (complete list) –
Kaniuhu, supreme high chief (1185–1215)
Kanipahu, supreme high chief (1215–1245)
Kamaʻiole, usurper (1245–1255)
Kalapana of Hawaiʻi, supreme high chief (1255–1285)
Kahaʻimaoeleʻa, supreme high chief (1285–1315)

See also
 List of state leaders in the 13th-century Holy Roman Empire

References 

State leaders
 
-